Tiarama Adventist College is a coeducational Christian secondary school in Papeete, Tahiti, established in  1979.

History

Early Beginnings in French Polynesia
The first Adventist missionaries to Tahiti were the Gates, Read, and Tay families, who arrived on the missionary boat, Pitcairn, on 25 December 1890. They and their successors for nearly fifty years were English-speaking.

Paul Deane, a Protestant pastor, and his wife were the first converts. They were baptised in 1893 and in the following year they went to the island of Raiatea, 180 km north-west of Tahiti, to assist Benjamin J Cady (from USA), who was the first President. As Mr Deane was of French nationality and could speak both French and Tahitian, he received a permit from the French government to open the first Adventist school. It is not known how many students attended this school, but it did not last long.

The School in Tahiti
From 1947 on, the pastors who came to French Polynesia were French-speaking. On 2 April 1960, when Pastor Ernest Veuthy was President, Pastor and Mrs Marcel Bornert opened the second French Polynesian school in Papeete, with an enrolment of 42 pupils.

For many years, as the enrolment grew, this school struggled to obtain teachers. The only way to recruit new Adventist teachers was to send trainees to the college (now Saleve Adventist University) at Collonges-sous-Salève in France. The cost to students of this solution was almost prohibitive because of the distance (20,000 km), the length of the course (three or four years), and the cost of school fees. Understandably there was no rush of applicants.

The next solution was to call for Adventist principals and teachers from France. Thus from 1964 to 1975 teachers such as Mrs Andrée Jérôme, Mr Marcel Fernandez, Mr Daniel Schmidt, Mr Christian Sanchez, and Mr Roland Vurpillot responded to such calls. The weaknesses of this system were the high cost to the Mission budget and the problem of changing staff every two years.

Government Assistance
Church leaders began to ask why they couldn’t ask the government for financial assistance. Back in 1789, during the French Revolution, the Declaration of the Rights of Man and of the Citizen had been promulgated, and church and state had been separated. However, as time passed the French State began to recognise that churches which operated schools were contributing to the development of the state by preparing trained citizens to hold responsibilities and contribute to national production. Thus in 1959 the French National Education Ministry issued the Loi Debré which allowed private schools, both Catholic and Protestant, to apply for financial appropriations.

In September 1974 Pastor Jean Surel, Mission President, and Roland Vurpillot, the principal at that time, studied the question of accepting financial help from the government and the attached conditions. As a result, an agreement called Contrat simple was signed by the State, the Local Government, and the Mission.

In September 1993 this arrangement was superseded by the Contrat d’association. The essential features of this contract are:
1 Teachers must have the Brevet élémentaire or the Baccalauréat. (The first year of university examination taken by high school students. Two years university study leads to the obtaining of a Licence which corresponds to a BA in the English system).
2 A new teacher can be recognised after a year of probation and sits a final examination after three years of training
3 Teachers in private and public schools are treated on the same level.
4 The State pays the teacher’s salary, whether qualified or not.
5 The State inspects the teacher in his/her class once he/she is qualified.
6 The private school is to follow the same curriculum as the public school.
7 There is a special appropriation for school stationery.
8 The Mission is responsible for the maintenance of the school building.

This new contract solved the school’s financial problems, facilitated the upgrading of teachers’ qualifications and raised the school’s academic level. It made it possible for a public school teacher to come and serve in the Adventist school.

In September 1975, the school already had six classes totalling 120 pupils from six to fifteen years of age. The mission had recently held a church session which voted two projects during the next five years: an Adventist college for secondary students and the extension downwards of the primary school to include the École Maternelle or infant school catering for children aged three, four, and five. The latter project took two years and a half. It took time for members and administrators to accept the value of such a project, and some of them remembered statements from early church documents known as the Spirit of Prophecy writings which discouraged parents from sending their children to school before the age of six. But eventually they came to realise that times had changed and their thinking must change also.

On 16 February 1978 the new building opened, incorporating the elementary section (6 to 10 years) and the maternelle (3 to 5 years). At the opening Pastor Lazare Doom, the first local Mission President, named the school the Tiarama School. The name ‘tiarama’ means ‘lamp’ or ‘light’ in Tahitian.

Pic Vert College
The old school building was not destroyed. It became the first home of a new Adventist college, or secondary school, while a search for a more suitable site continued. In August 1979 Dr Jean Reynaud, previously from Avondale College in Australia, was privileged to start the first secondary class, and a new class was added each year until there were four.

In August 1983 the college moved to its new location and became Collège du Pic Vert, with 110 students. It was situated above the valley of Tipaerui, a suburb of Papeete, on a hill called Pic Vert at some 460m above sea level, and only a drive of 15 minutes from the centre of Papeete.

After Dr Reynaud’s departure in 1987 he was succeeded in turn by Dr Jean Michel Martin, Mrs Delargilière, Dettory Campus, and Imbert Jacques, all who came from France.

Unfortunately, enrolment dropped each year after 1983, until in 1990 it was proposed to close the college. Only with government help could the school be kept open. It took four years to get government agreement for all four classes. Even with that help, the enrolments dropped steadily, until in 2000 the school opened with only 69 students. The decline was attributed partly to the isolation of the school, and the resulting transport problems, including the steep, winding road up the mountain. Accordingly in 2001 the college moved back down to the urban area of Papeete, to share the site with the elementary school. It was renamed Collège Tiarama, and since then it has experienced steady growth. Pastor Charles Atger, a Tahitian, is now in charge.

See also
List of Seventh-day Adventist secondary schools

References

External links
Tiarama Adventist College - Adventist Yearbook

TAC
SAC
1979 establishments in French Polynesia